Jaycie is a given name. Notable people with the name include:

Jaycie Johnson (born 1995), American soccer player
Jaycie Phelps (born 1979), American former gymnast

See also
Jaycee (given name)
JC (disambiguation), include list of people whose names being with the initials
Jayce, given name